Epke Jan Zonderland (born 16 April 1986) is a Dutch artistic gymnast and the 2012 Olympic gold medallist on high bar. He is a 4-time Olympian (2008–20) and has also taken 3 World Championships golds on high bar at the 2013, 2014 and 2018 World Championships, the first man to secure this feat on that apparatus. He is nicknamed "The Flying Dutchman.”

Early life
Zonderland was born on 16 April 1986 in Lemmer, Netherlands.  He started gymnastics at the age of four. He has two brothers (Herre and Johan) and one sister (Geeske) who are also international gymnasts.

Zonderland enrolled to study medicine at the University of Groningen in 2006. He took 12 years to complete his degree in medicine as he was pursuing his career in gymnastics at the same time, and qualified as a medical doctor in 2018.

Gymnastics career

2004
Zonderland reached his first international success as a junior in 2004. At the European Junior Championships in Ljubljana he was fourth in the all-around event and he won a silver medal on the horizontal bar. That same year he also became Dutch national all-around champion by taking over the title from his older brother Herre.

2005–2006
In 2005 at the World Championships in Melbourne, Zonderland and Jeffrey Wammes were the first ever Dutch gymnasts in the history of the sport to qualify for the all-around final. Zonderland eventually ended up in the 11th position. In that same year at the European Championships he finished 15th, which was a disappointment considering his World Championship result.

After his success in 2005 he continued in 2006 by reaching the final of the horizontal bar competition during the European Championships in Volos, where he was 6th. At the World Cup meeting in Glasgow on the same discipline he won the silver medal and in Tehran, Zonderland claimed his first World Cup win and the gold medal. That year he also became Dutch national all-around champion for the second time in his career.

2007-2008
In 2007 he competed in both the European and the World Championships. At the European Championships in Amsterdam he finished sixth in the individual all-around (IAA) event, the highest ever position by a Dutch gymnast. During the same Championships he also won the bronze medal on the parallel bars. Later, in September at the World Championships in Stuttgart Zonderland finished 4th on the horizontal bar, which earned him a qualification for the 2008 Summer Olympics in Beijing. Later in 2007 he won his second World Cup event at the horizontal bar in Glasgow.

At the 2008 Summer Olympics, Zonderland reached the high bar final in which he finished seventh.

2009–2011
In 2009, he won the silver medal on high bar at the 2009 World Artistic Gymnastics Championships. At the 2010 World Championships in Rotterdam, he earned another silver medal on high bar. In 2011 he became European champion for the first time.

2012 Olympics
At the 2012 Summer Olympics, Zonderland won an Olympic gold medal in the high bar with a personal best score of 16.533. His routine included a triple combo of Cassina-Kovacs-Kolman, then the most difficult release combination.  His performance was regarded by many as one of the top performances of the 2012 games. The first Dutch gymnast (male or female) to win an individual Olympic medal, he also won the first Olympic gymnastics medal in 84 years for the Netherlands.

2013–2014
At the 2013 World Championships in Antwerp, Zonderland became world champion for the first time.  He performed a double combo of Cassina-Kovacs followed by Kolman-Gaylord 2 with a stuck double-twisting double layout dismount.

In 2014, Zonderland won the championship title again on high bar at the 2014 European Championships in Sofia, Bulgaria. He also successfully defended his world title at the 2014 World Gymnastics Championships in Nanning, China.

2015–2017
In April 2015, Zonderland failed to defend the European title after falling off the high bar. In August 2015, he fell in training, which left him with a concussion and an injury to his thumb. The injury curtailed his training times and he failed to make the final to defend his world title at the 2015 World Championship in Glasgow.

In 2016, Zonderland sprained his fingers again during training in June, just before the 2016 Summer Olympics. He failed to defend his Olympic title at the Olympics after falling in his high bar routine.

On 16–17 September 2017, Zonderland competed at the 2017 Paris Challenge Cup in France where he won gold in the high bar individual event, scoring 14.800. He then competed at the 2017 World Championships in Montreal. In the high bar event final, he caught the bar with just one hand after a flight element, but managed to stay on with only his right hand to swing into a giant despite glaring leg separation, and successfully finished his routine. He earned a silver medal, scoring 14.233.

2018–2019
On August 9–12, 2018, Zonderland competed at the 2018 European Artistic Gymnastics Championships in Glasgow, Scotland, where he won the silver medal—thanks heavily to his top D-score of 6.8 that was at least ½ a point more than the next highest finalist's D-score—behind Oliver Hegi of Switzerland. At the 2018 World Championships in Doha, Qatar, Zonderland won gold on the high bar at the age of 32. His routine included two double release combinations, a Cassina to Kovacs, followed by a Kolman-Gaylord 2. He became the first man to win three high bar gold medals at the World Championships.

Zonderland competed down under at the 2019 Melbourne World Cup in Melbourne, Australia, from February 21 to 24, 2019. He and Hidetaka Miyachi of Japan scored identical highest combined scores of 14.733 in the individual horizontal bar apparatus final. However, after activating the tiebreak procedure, Zonderland was relegated to the silver medal because Miyachi's execution score number was higher than his own. Also, between April 10 and 14, 2019, at the European Artistic Gymnastics Championships–an FIG championships held in Szczecin, Poland—Zonderland won his third European gold medal in the individual horizontal bar apparatus final. However, he failed to qualify for the same event final at the 2019 World Artistic Gymnastics Championships in Stuttgart after an error in his routine.

2020/2021 Olympics
At the 2020 Summer Olympics in Tokyo, Japan, Zonderland did not qualify for the individual horizontal bar finals after ranking 23rd with a score of 13.833 due to a fall in the qualification rounds.

Honours and awards 
 
Zonderland was named Dutch Sportsman of the year in 2009 for his silver medal in high bar at the 2009 World Championships. He was selected Sportsman of the Year for a second time in 2011 after he won the European Championships, then again for the next two consecutive years after he won the 2012 Olympic and the 2013 World championships. He was made a Knight of the Order of Orange-Nassau after he won the gold medal at the 2012 London Olympics.

Personal life
Zonderland married Linda Steen in September 2016. Their son, Bert Eize, was born on 13 October 2018, and a second son Jan was born on 1 April 2021.  On November 1 2022 their third child, daughter Sophie, was born.

Competitive history

References

External links

 
 
 
 
 
 The gold medal routine at the 2012 Olympics
 The gold medal routine at the 2013 World Championships
 Zonderland (parallel bars skill)

1986 births
Living people
Dutch male artistic gymnasts
Medalists at the 2012 Summer Olympics
Olympic medalists in gymnastics
Olympic gold medalists for the Netherlands
Olympic gymnasts of the Netherlands
Gymnasts at the 2008 Summer Olympics
Gymnasts at the 2012 Summer Olympics
Gymnasts at the 2016 Summer Olympics
Medalists at the World Artistic Gymnastics Championships
People from De Fryske Marren
Sportspeople from Friesland
World champion gymnasts
European champions in gymnastics
Gymnasts at the 2020 Summer Olympics
21st-century Dutch people
20th-century Dutch people